Dingley is an extinct town in Osage County, in the U.S. state of Missouri.

A post office called Dingley was established in 1907, and remained in operation until 1909. Besides the post office, the community had a schoolhouse.  The schoolhouse was named after Edward Dingley, the original owner of the site.

References

Ghost towns in Missouri
Former populated places in Osage County, Missouri